The  is a group of  or  (painted narrative handscrolls) from the Kamakura period of Japanese history (1185–1333).

Amongst the various  bearing this title, the original version from 1299, named , is the best known and most famous. A second version, made in a more accessible style in the 14th century, and named , also recounts the biography of the monk. As many copies of these two original  were subsequently produced, the whole group is often referred to under the term .

Less refined, it has a proselytising vocation and aims to establish 's legitimacy as co-founder of the school. This version, now destroyed, has reached us through its various copies.

Background

arts

Originating in Japan in the sixth or seventh century through trade with the Chinese Empire,  art spread widely among the aristocracy in the Heian period. An  consists of one or more long rolls of paper narrating a story through  texts and paintings. The narrative assumes a series of scenes, the rhythm, composition and transitions of which are entirely the artist's sensitivity and technique. The themes of the stories were very varied: illustrations of novels, historical chronicles, religious texts, biographies of famous people, humorous or fantastic anecdotes, etc.

The Kamakura period (12th–14th century), which followed a period of unrest and civil war, was marked by the arrival in power of the warrior class (the samurai). This politically and socially unstable period provided fertile ground for Buddhism to proselytize, whether through the depiction of the sutras, or by illustrated accounts of the lives of illustrious monks.

The  fits into this context. Biographies of monks ( or ) were very popular at the time of the Kamakura, that theme being favoured by the emergence of many Pure Land Buddhist schools.

and the  school

Following the Pure Land principles,  taught that the Amida Buddha (Amitābha) welcomes into his paradise anyone who has faith in him; he initiates the faithful to the daily recitation of the name of the Amida Buddha and the rituals of ecstatic dances and songs, a simple religious practice accessible to all, even the poor and the uneducated.

Born in 1239,  was the second son of a family of the  samurai clan in Iyo Province. In the summer of 1274,  retired to the Kumano shrine, a sacred place of the Shinto religion.

From then onwards,  travelled to temples and shrines in Japan to spread this doctrine. As a sign of a time when religious education was becoming more popular and accessible,  preached in all places of everyday life: inns, markets, villages ... He accompanied his recitations of the name of Amida with ecstatic dances which seduced the populace with their "frenzied exaltation". He is said to have asked that no funeral rites be held for him.

It seems that  converted a large segment of the population to the  doctrine, perhaps more than 250,000 people. From the middle of the 14th century to the early 16th century,  was probably one of the most popular Amidist schools in Japan. However, in the 16th century, it greatly lost influence, and nowadays it is no longer a minority religious movement.

The two versions of the 

The exhaustive list of temples or institutions with a copy today (excluding private collections and fragments) is:

version (1299):

Description 

The sponsor is not known for sure or named on the colophon. The most commonly advanced hypothesis as to the identity of this patron is that of the Grand Chancellor .

Part of Scroll VII, stored at the Tokyo National Museum since 1951, and a fragment of Scroll VI belonging to a private collector, were detached at the beginning of the Meiji era. Their state of preservation is generally good, despite a few lost or erased fragments.

Themes

The texts of the  version narrate the key episodes of 's life in three broad periods: his initiation and his studies of Buddhism until the revelation of 1274 in Kumano, the creation of the congregation that would become the  school, and the end of his life as he attracted large crowds of faithful to his sermons. Throughout the biography 's sermons, prayers and many  poems are quoted. Other texts on the foundation of temples and shrines visited by the monk are also included. The calligraphies are more proselytising and relate the various miracles attributed to  during his life, so that the text rarely corresponds to the images. The creator however avoids any excess and in this biography expresses affection and respect towards .

The  version also appears very refined, full of restraint and intended for an elite, reviving the literary and pictorial tradition of the Heian court. The paintings and texts give a lyrical atmosphere to the work, via the themes of poetry, travel and pilgrimage. The landscapes are very numerous, faithfully transcribing easily recognizable famous Japanese sights, such as the emergence of Mount Fuji above the mist, the Itsukushima Shrine or the Nachi Falls, as well as numerous temples and places of pilgrimage such as Mount Kōya or Kumano shrine, the visiting of which had great importance in 's life (and therefore loomed large). The work is similar in this sense to  paintings (paintings of famous views) and travelogues, traditional themes associated with the Imperial Court and poetry.

The importance given to landscapes and genre scenes remains rare in illustrated biographies of monks: here, the painter alternates stylised landscapes inspired by traditional Heian poetry and realistic representations of places and people, an original approach in the  movement. By comparison, other illustrated biographies of monks (such as the ) emphasise the characters and the dynamism of the narrative, or fall into stereotyping and repetition.

Style and composition 

The , characterized by its realism and colours, belongs to the  style of the Kamakura period. However, unlike most  of the day, the early influences of the wash technique of the Song dynasty in China are also on display. The work is based on the alternation between calligraphy and painted sequences, over 48 sections in total (in reference to the 48 wishes of Amida). Transitions between paintings are most often marked by expanses of mist or water, buildings or the change of seasons.

The classic  technique, which consists of representing the same character several times in a scene to suggest the flow of time and vary the rhythm with great economy of means, is also used on several paintings, for example the scene of the warriors (Scroll IV, Section 3), who, in the centre, first threaten , but then, at top left, are converted by the monk.  having dedicated his life to roaming, the travel scenes dominate the work, but despite the importance of the landscapes, the subjective and non-realistic Japanese perspective remains tangible, the main elements of each section being enlarged in relation to the proportions of the sets. In particular,  and his group always appear unusually tall compared with other characters and buildings, as they are central to the story (the religious  had mainly a didactic interest). The point of view adopted varies between scenes in the same section in order to energise the story, which can sometimes be unusually distant, so that the details and the crowd become minuscule.

Landscape scenes, often performed in the styles of Chinese Tang ("blue and green"), Song and Yuan painting, dominate the composition in the Chinese lyrical and spiritual tradition (the art of shan shui). In particular, the first influences of the Song wash technique in Japan show through, the contours and inking being very close to the lively and rough line. Several details reveal that the artists were inspired by the style of the Southern Song: the framing of the compositions, the depth of the landscapes rendered by a succession of images, or the use of the side of the brush rather than the tip for the contours of the mountains. The influence of Chinese landscapes explains the marked realism of the paintings, especially in perspective, a realism that characterises the art of the Kamakura period. Thus, in spite of the unrealistic sizes of the characters and improbable points of view in height, the landscapes are most often deep and rigorously proportioned, reinforced by pictorial techniques such as painting the trees in a detailed way in the foreground and blurred in the background, or even flocks of birds that gradually disappear towards the horizon. The colour itself finally makes it possible to reinforce the hollows and reliefs.

Realism, much appreciated by the Kamakura , was thus born from the influences of the Chinese landscape, but also reinforced by the dynamic and very detailed representation of everyday life. The  of the 13th  century attached particular importance to the representation of crowds here, with a penchant for the common. The drawings of the buildings still in existence today are for the most part so detailed that sketches must have been made on the spot during 's travels, probably by  himself. The contrast between the precision of architectural details and unrealistic parallel perspective is felt in all the buildings. There is in fact a correspondence between certain landscapes and feelings conveyed by the story, for example the cherry trees of  painted just after flowering when  leaves his home, to evoke the separation.

version (1304/1307):  
The  version aims to consolidate 's position as 's rightful successor, and presents an idealized and exaggerated view of the school. Unlike the  version, it clearly had a goal of proselytising, with the aim of converting and teaching poorly educated people. As a result, its composition is simpler and more varied, centred on the anecdotal, ultimately to convey everyday feelings such as humour or emotion, as well as the miraculous. This version, a rare document from the early days of the school, and intended for the general public, has been more copied than the  version.

In relation to several of their scenes, the various copies of the  version diverge in the importance given to certain characters or certain details, but the plan remains very similar.

Historiographical value 

Beyond Buddhism, Japanese syncretism sometimes shines through, especially when  honours Shinto shrines.

An everyday art, 's original version of the  also provides a detailed testimony to the daily life of medieval Japan, as well as to the landscapes of the time (notably offering one of the first pictorial views of Mount Fuji). Today, the work presents such invaluable insights that it is widely studied, as much by historians as by art historians.

Historians' studies focus on housing, clothing, food, travel, economic activities, rituals and social and cultural practices. As  devoted his life to travelling, the urban as well as the rural aspect stands out. The artist represents both the poor and the rich, focusing on beggars and the sick who sometimes litter the place,  having preached to everyone. K. Satō sees in this the desire to "show us who were the people to whom Ippen really wanted to address" in medieval society: the downgraded, beggars and outcasts.

See also
List of National Treasures of Japan (paintings)
National Treasure (Japan)

References

Notes

Bibliography

Books and Theses

Journal articles and conference proceedings

External links

Emakimono
National Treasures of Japan